Heline Babiene Eweni (born 1996) is a Cameroonian activist and philanthropist helping vulnerable women and children and people with disability. Her philanthropy is noted by her support to people displaced by civil conflict between Cameroonian government and Anglophone separatists. Eweni became an orphan when she loss her both parents at a tender age. Her humanitarian services started by rendering community service through Exceptional Youth Initiative which focuses on free cleaning services in communities. Later, Eweni registered the organisation as a non-profit organisation.

Award 
Eweni was named the prize winner of the 2019 Future Africa Leaders Award (FALA) in Nigeria.

References 

1996 births
Living people
21st-century Cameroonian women
Cameroonian philanthropists